The Tensas River  is a river in Louisiana in the United States. The river, known as Tensas Bayou in its upper reaches, begins in East Carroll Parish in the northeast corner of the state and runs roughly southwest for  more or less in parallel with the Mississippi River. The Tensas River merges with the Ouachita River in Jonesville in Catahoula Parish to become the Black River, not to be confused with Black Lake in Natchitoches Parish in north central Louisiana.

For the twenty miles south of Interstate 20 between Delhi and Tallulah, the river winds its way through the Tensas River National Wildlife Refuge (in Madison, Franklin, and Tensas parishes), which was established in 1980 "for the preservation and development of environmental resources" about the river. In 1881 the Congress authorized the U.S. Army Corps of Engineers to improve the navigation by removing ordinary obstacles. The navigation work began at Dallas, a village on the stream in Madison Parish. The bottomland hardwood forest near the Tensas River is some of the remaining habitat of the Louisiana black bear.

The name Tensas is derived from the historic indigenous Taensa people. The first plantations along the Tensas River were established by settlers who had earlier plantations across the Mississippi River in the Natchez District.

See also
List of Louisiana rivers

References

Tensas River National Wildlife Refuge, http://www.fws.gov/tensasriver/, Retrieved 23 April 2005

Rivers of Louisiana
Rivers of Catahoula Parish, Louisiana
Rivers of East Carroll Parish, Louisiana
Rivers of Madison Parish, Louisiana
Rivers of Franklin Parish, Louisiana
Rivers of Tensas Parish, Louisiana
Rivers of Concordia Parish, Louisiana
Ouachita River
Tributaries of the Red River of the South